Marjorie Augusta Gateson (January 17, 1891 – April 17, 1977) was an American stage and film actress.

Biography

Gateson was born in Brooklyn, New York, to Augusta and Daniel Gateson. Her maternal grandfather and brother were clergymen; Some sources state her father was one too, but Axel Nissen in his book Mothers, Mammies and Old Maids: Twenty-Five Character Actresses of Golden Age Hollywood writes that he was a contractor. She attended the Packer Collegiate Institute and the Brooklyn Conservatory of Music, the latter being where her mother taught elocution. She believed her mother had "an inner longing for the stage", which she passed on to Marjorie, along with diction and poise.

Gateson's musical schooling helped her land a job in the chorus in a play called The Pink Lady. She made her Broadway debut at the age of 21 in the chorus of the musical The Dove of Peace on November 4, 1912; the show closed after 12 performances. During the much longer run of her next Broadway play, The Little Cafe (November 12, 1913 – March 14, 1914), she played several of the characters. In 1917's Broadway musical Have a Heart, she sang two songs. She performed in musical comedies for another decade, ending with Oh, Ernest! (1927), but also appeared in non-musical comedies and dramas. After the Broadway comedy As Good as New in 1930, she set out for Hollywood.

Gateson made her film debut in 1931, after more than two decades on the stage, playing secondary character roles as women of wealth and breeding, who were often haughty and aloof. She is perhaps best known as the society matron who attempts to thwart Mae West's character's plans for social climbing in the 1935 film Goin' to Town, and as a rather kinder socialite whom Harold Lloyd teaches to box in 1936's The Milky Way.

Other films in which she appeared include The King's Vacation (1933; her largest role, the female lead opposite George Arliss), Bureau of Missing Persons (1933), Private Number (1936), You'll Never Get Rich (1941), International Lady (1941), and Meet The Stewarts (1942). Her film work petered out in the late 1940s, and she jumped into television roles.

She made her small screen debut in 1949. She was featured in the 1949 television soap opera One Man's Family and found success in 1954 at age 63 playing matriarch Grace Harris Tyrell on the daytime soap The Secret Storm, a role she would play until 1968. Gateson also made numerous other television appearances in the 1950s, including episodes of Hallmark Hall of Fame, Robert Montgomery Presents, and United States Steel Hour.

Gateson never married and said: "I wanted nothing but to be an actress. I didn't even consider trying both."

Gateson suffered a stroke, which ended her acting career, and died several years later in 1977 of pneumonia, at the age of 86 in Manhattan.

Selected filmography

 The Beloved Bachelor (1931) - Hortense Cole
 The False Madonna (1931) - Rose
 Working Girls (1931) - Modiste (uncredited)
 Husband's Holiday (1931) - Loretta (scenes deleted)
 Society Girl (1932) - Alice Converse
 Street of Women (1932) - Lois Baldwin
 Okay, America! (1932) - Mrs. Herbert Wright
 Thirteen Women (1932) - Hazel's Travel Companion (uncredited)
 Silver Dollar (1932) - Mrs. Adams (uncredited)
 The King's Vacation (1933) - Helen Everhardt
 Employees' Entrance (1933) - Mrs. Hickox
 Lilly Turner (1933) - Mrs. Bessie 'Ma' McGill
 Cocktail Hour (1933) - Mrs. Pat Lawton
 Melody Cruise (1933) - Mrs. Wells
 Blind Adventure (1933) - Grace Thorne
 Bureau of Missing Persons (1933) - Mrs. Paul
 Walls of Gold (1933) - Cassie Street
 Fog (1933)
 The World Changes (1933) - Mrs. Clinton
 Lady Killer (1933) - Mrs. Wilbur Marley
 Let's Fall in Love (1933) - Agatha
 Hi, Nellie! (1934) - Mrs. Canfield
 Coming Out Party (1934) - Mrs. Ada Stanhope
 Operator 13 (1934) - Mrs. Shackleford
 Side Streets (1934) - Mrs. Thatcher (scenes deleted)
 Down to Their Last Yacht (1934) - Mrs. Geoffrey Colt-Stratton
 Chained (1934) - Mrs. Louise Field
 Million Dollar Ransom (1934) - Elita Casserly
 Big Hearted Herbert (1934) - Amy Goodrich
 Happiness Ahead (1934) - Mrs. Bradford
 Gentlemen Are Born (1934) - Mrs. Harper
 Goin' to Town (1935) - Mrs. Crane Brittony
 His Family Tree (1935) - Margaret 'Maggie' Murfree - aka Murphy
 Your Uncle Dudley (1935) - Mabel Dixon
 The Milky Way (1936) - Mrs. E. Winthrop LeMoyne
 Wife vs. Secretary (1936) - Eve Merritt
 The First Baby (1936) - Mrs. Wells
 Big Brown Eyes (1936) - Mrs. Cole
 Private Number (1936) - Mrs. Winfield
 Anthony Adverse (1936) - Minor Role (uncredited)
 The Gentleman from Louisiana (1936) - Fay Costigan
 Three Married Men (1936) - Clara
 The Man I Marry (1936) - Eloise Hartley
 Arizona Mahoney (1936) - Safroney Jones
 We Have Our Moments (1937) - Mrs. Rutherford
 Turn Off the Moon (1937) - Myrtle Tweep
 Walter Wanger's Vogues of 1938 (1937) - Mrs. George Curtis-Lemke
 First Lady (1937) - Sophy Prescott
 No Time to Marry (1938) - Mrs. Pettensall
 Making the Headlines (1938) - Muffin Wilder
 Gateway (1938) - Mrs. Arabella McNutt
 Stablemates (1938) - Mrs. Shepherd
 Spring Madness (1938) - Miss Ritchie
 The Duke of West Point (1938) - Mrs. Drew
 The Spirit of Culver (1939) - Mrs. Macy, June Mother (uncredited)
 My Wife's Relatives (1939) - Mrs. Ellis
 Too Busy to Work (1939) - Mrs. Randolph Russell
 Geronimo (1939) - Mrs. Steele
 Parole Fixer (1940) - Mrs. Thorton Casserly
 'Til We Meet Again (1940) - Mrs. Hester
 In Old Missouri (1940) - Mrs. Pittman
 Escape to Glory (1940) - Mrs. Winslow
 Pop Always Pays (1940) - Mrs. Brewster
 Andy Hardy Meets Debutante (1940) - Mrs. Desmond Fowler (uncredited)
 Third Finger, Left Hand (1940) - Mrs. Russell (uncredited)
 I'm Nobody's Sweetheart Now (1940) - Mrs. Morgan
 Back Street (1941) - Mrs. Adams
 Here Comes Happiness (1941) - Emily Vance
 You'll Never Get Rich (1941) - Aunt Louise
 Passage from Hong Kong (1941)  - Aunt Julia
 Moonlight in Hawaii (1941) - Aunt Effie Floto
 International Lady (1941) - Bertha Grenner
 Honolulu Lu (1941) - Mrs. Van Derholt
 Obliging Young Lady (1942) - Mira Potter
 Rings on Her Fingers (1942) - Mrs. Fenwick
 Juke Box Jenny (1942) - Mrs. Horton
 Meet the Stewarts (1942) - Mrs. Goodwin
 No Time for Love (1943) - Sophie
 The Youngest Profession (1943) - Mrs. Drew
 Rhythm of the Islands (1943) - Mrs. Holton
 The Sky's the Limit (1943) - Canteen Hostess
 I Dood It (1943) - Mrs. Spelvin
 Casanova in Burlesque (1944) - Lucille Compton
 Hi, Good Lookin'! (1944) - Mrs. Clara Hardacre
 Seven Days Ashore (1944) - Mrs. Elizabeth Arland
 Ever Since Venus (1944) - Maude Hackett
 One More Tomorrow (1946) - Aunt Edna Collier
 The Caddy (1953) - Mrs. Grace Taylor

References

External links

1891 births
1977 deaths
20th-century American actresses
American film actresses
American soap opera actresses
American stage actresses
American television actresses
Deaths from pneumonia in New York City
People from Brooklyn
Actresses from New York City